Ginger Island is a presently uninhabited island of the British Virgin Islands in the Caribbean. It is one of the last undeveloped privately held islands in the territory. It is the location of two of the better dive sites in the British Virgin Islands: "Alice in Wonderland" and "Ginger Steppes". The island is owned by the Aggie Sailing Team. Most people do not go on the island, as there is no dockage and the island is very overgrown.

See also
 List of lighthouses in the British Virgin Islands

References

External links

Uninhabited islands of the British Virgin Islands
Private islands of the British Virgin Islands
Lighthouses in the British Virgin Islands